David Leisner is a classical guitarist, composer, and teacher at the Manhattan School of Music. He previously also taught at the New England Conservatory.

Prior to being disabled by focal dystonia, Leisner received international recognition and placed in competitions in Toronto and at the Geneva International Guitar Competition. 

He is also the author of Playing With Ease.

References

External links

Year of birth missing (living people)
American guitarists
Manhattan School of Music faculty
Musicians with dystonia
Living people